Carl Rickard Wallin (born April 9, 1980) is a Swedish former professional ice hockey centre who last played for Färjestad of the Elitserien (SEL).

Playing career
Wallin made his debut in the Swedish Hockey League with Färjestad BK during the 1998-99 season. He was drafted in 1998 NHL Entry Draft in the 6th round as the 160th overall pick overall by the Phoenix Coyotes. Before playing any games with the Coyotes, Wallin was traded to the Minnesota Wild for Joé Juneau on June 23, 2000. After winning the Swedish Championship with Färjestad in 2002, Wallin signed with the Wild during the summer of 2002. Wallin spent three years in the Wild organisation, playing 19 games with the Wild and scoring ten points (six goals and four assists). In September 2005, he returned to Sweden and Färjestad. That season, he won his second Swedish Championship. After the season, he signed with Lugano of the Swiss Nationalliga A, but he stayed only one season with Lugano. He returned to Färjestad in 2007 and - serving as team captain - helped the team win another SHL title in 2009.

Wallin signed a one-year contract with the Toronto Maple Leafs on July 9, 2009. In returning to the NHL Wallin played in a career high 60 games but was unable to contribute consistently offensively with 2 goals and 7 assists for just 9 points in the 2009–10 season.

On May 25, 2010, Rickard returned again to Färjestad of the SEL signing a four-year contract. He won his fourth SHL title in the 2010-11 season.

On April 27, 2016, Wallin officially announced his retirement.

International career 
He won 109 caps for the Swedish national team, winning a silver medal at the 2011 World Championships and bronze at the 2009 and 2010 World Championships.

Career statistics

Regular season and playoffs

International

References

External links

 Wallin retires

1980 births
Arizona Coyotes draft picks
Färjestad BK players
Houston Aeros (1994–2013) players
Living people
Minnesota Wild players
Ice hockey people from Stockholm
Swedish ice hockey centres
Swedish expatriate ice hockey players in Canada
Swedish expatriate sportspeople in Switzerland
Swedish expatriate ice hockey players in the United States
Toronto Maple Leafs players
VIK Västerås HK players